Ovid is a city in the U.S. state of Michigan. Nearly all of the city is located within Clinton County with only a very small portion extending east into Shiawassee County.  The population was 1,603 at the 2010 census.

Ovid incorporated as a city in 2015, making it Michigan's most-recently incorporated city.

Etymology
Ovid was named after Ovid, New York, the hometown of a settler named William Swarthout who migrated here in the mid-1800s.

Geography

The city is located in both Clinton County to the west and Shiawassee County to the east.  The vast majority of the city's boundaries are within Clinton County.  Only a very small portion extends east of Meridian Street, which serves as the county line.  The 2010 census lists all  of Ovid within Clinton County and no land area within Shiawassee County.  However, the 2010 census listed six residents out of 1,603 (0.37%) as being in Shiawassee County.

Demographics

2010 census
As of the census of 2010, there were 1,603 people, 578 households, and 398 families living in the city. The racial makeup of the city was 95.7% White, 0.4% African American, 0.3% Native American, 0.1% Asian, 0.1% Pacific Islander, 1.3% from other races, and 2.1% from two or more races. Hispanic or Latino of any race were 5.7% of the population.

There were 578 households, of which 41.3% had children under the age of 18 living with them, 43.1% were married couples living together, 18.9% had a female householder with no husband present, 6.9% had a male householder with no wife present, and 31.1% were non-families. 25.6% of all households were made up of individuals, and 10% had someone living alone who was 65 years of age or older. The average household size was 2.63 and the average family size was 3.12.

The median age in the city was 35 years. 29.4% of residents were under the age of 18; 7.7% were between the ages of 18 and 24; 27.2% were from 25 to 44; 20.5% were from 45 to 64; and 15.2% were 65 years of age or older. The gender makeup of the city was 45.6% male and 54.4% female.

2000 census
As of the census of 2000, there were 1,514 people, 575 households, and 400 families living in the city. The racial makeup of the city was 96.30% White, 0.13% African American, 0.59% Native American, 0.13% Pacific Islander, 1.25% from other races, and 1.59% from two or more races. Hispanic or Latino of any race were 4.23% of the population.

There were 575 households, out of which 38.1% had children under the age of 18 living with them, 51.1% were married couples living together, 14.8% had a female householder with no husband present, and 30.3% were non-families. 23.5% of all households were made up of individuals, and 8.3% had someone living alone who was 65 years of age or older.  The average household size was 2.63 and the average family size was 3.13.

In the city, the population was spread out, with 29.6% under the age of 18, 10.8% from 18 to 24, 29.6% from 25 to 44, 18.5% from 45 to 64, and 11.6% who were 65 years of age or older.  The median age was 32 years. For every 100 females, there were 90.2 males.  For every 100 females age 18 and over, there were 85.1 males.

The median income for a household in the city was $33,333, and the median income for a family was $38,235. Males had a median income of $33,438 versus $22,083 for females. The per capita income for the city was $15,324.  About 10.5% of families and 11.5% of the population were below the poverty line, including 16.9% of those under age 18 and 3.1% of those age 65 or over.

Education
Ovid and nearby Elsie are served by the Ovid-Elsie Area Schools, which operates two elementary schools, one middle school, and one high school.
Leonard Elementary School, in Ovid (Also houses the Alternative High School) 
E.E. Knight Elementary School, in Elsie
Ovid-Elsie Middle School, in Elsie
Ovid-Elsie High School, in Elsie
Former school: North Elementary School, in Ovid - building sold to convert into a senior and assisted living facility.

Highways

Notable people
Louis Filler, American social historian

References

Cities in Clinton County, Michigan
Cities in Shiawassee County, Michigan
Lansing–East Lansing metropolitan area
Populated places established in 1867
1867 establishments in Michigan